Fulvimonas yonginensis is a Gram-negative, aerobic and rod-shaped bacterium from the genus of Fulvimonas with a polar flagellum which has been isolated from greenhouse soil from Yongin in Korea.

References

Xanthomonadales
Bacteria described in 2014